Binnören is a Swedish island belonging to the Kalix archipelago. It is connected to Rönnören by a road over a dam, which is connected to the mainland by a road. The island is uninhabited.

References 

Islands of Norrbotten County
Swedish islands in the Baltic